Catesby is an unincorporated community located in Ellis County, Oklahoma, United States. Named for Catesby ap Roger Jones, the town was founded on July 1, 1902. The post office was opened by Ella M. Rose on February 18, 1902. The town remains a legal town site, although the post office was closed on January 1, 1970.

As of the centennial in 2002, there were two residents, making it the smallest townsite in Oklahoma.

Sources
Shirk, George H.; Oklahoma Place Names; University of Oklahoma Press; Norman, Oklahoma; 1987:  .

Unincorporated communities in Ellis County, Oklahoma
Unincorporated communities in Oklahoma